Annelise Josefsen (born 2 October 1949) is a Norwegian-Sami artist. She works in many different techniques, but has particularly marked herself as a sculptor. She has been active in the Sami Artists Association (SDS), serving as chair of the board for several periods.

Biography
Annelise Josefsen was born on 2 October 1949 in Hammerfest. She grew up in Sæterfjord, Kvalsund municipality, Finnmark. Her family ancestry is Seaside Sami.

Josefsen began her education at the Sami Folk High School in Karasjok. She then studied textile work at Finnmark homecraft school in Lakselv before furthering her training as an artist at the Western Academy of Fine Arts in Bergen (1979-1983).

On the occasion of her 60th birthday in 2009, she was invited to hold a separate exhibition in the Sami artist center, entitled "Dream and Deception". On 5 February 2017 the SDS opened the art exhibition ÁIGEMÁTKI (TIME TRAVEL) in Kraftbyen, Trondheim, as part of Tråante 2017. The exhibition shows works by 21 Sami artists from Norway, Sweden, and Finland. Josefsen was one of the artists represented at the exhibition. After exhibiting in Trondheim, the works traveled to other exhibition venues in the three countries.
In the same month, Norges Bank issued a 20-krone coin with a Sami motif in connection with Sámi Assembly of 1917, the 100th anniversary of the first national meeting of the same people. The coin was designed by Josefsen, who in 2016 won a competition for this assignment.

Josefsen lives and works in Kokelv, Revsbotten, Finnmark.

Public art
 2014: Muitu ("Remembrance"), war memorial at Tana church on Rustefjelbma in Tana municipality
 2013: Støttetroppen,, sculpture group in Iddefjord granite, the outdoor area in Setermoen camp
 2013: Bakmenn, decoration of foundation wall in the canteen at Lakselv upper secondary school
 2013: Potensial, sculpture outside Lakselv high school
 2011: Tanker for to, two sculptures in Tranøy sculpture park, Tranøy, Hamarøy: [16] [17]
Jente i tanker, Balmoral granite
Gutt i tanker, Kuru Gray granite
 2011: Rast ved veiskillet, Evjen granite. The sculpture stands at a resting place in the sculpture section of the Krutfjellsvägen at Tärnaby in Sweden
 2011: Min bovdna, sculpture in polyester and porcelain, Vestfold University College, Bakkenteigen
 2004: Iditboddu/Morgenstund,, sculpture group in concrete and metal; Sami sculpture park, Jokkmokk
 2004: Messepikene,, granite sculpture group; the outdoor area at the fair at Setermoen camp; this was the winner's draft in a decoration competition in 2004
 2004: Stallos hjerte, sculpture group in stone and wood, Statoil's administration building on Melkøya at Hammerfest
 2000: Den lille internat-tanta, sculpture, the outdoor area at Sameskolen in Målselv
 2000: U-dyr med to hoder, Ser to veier,, sculpture, outside area at Sameskolen in Målselv
 1993: Bølgen, sculpture in lime tree, Hammerfest Library
 1993: Uten tittel, sculpture in stone from Lødingen, at the university square in Tromsø

Awards
Josefsen has received a number of scholarships:
 1984: State establishment grant
 1985: Inger and Edvard Munch's scholarship
 1986: Nordic Council of Ministers' travel scholarship
 1987: Establishment grant
 1988: The Remuneration Fund
 1989: John Savio BKH Scholarship
 1991-1993: The state's 3-year scholarship for Sami artists
 2010: Sami Artists and Writers Remuneration Fund (SKFV) scholarship for spiritual practitioners
 2015: Sami Artists and Writers Remuneration Fund (SKFV) material grant for 2015
 2016: Sami Artists and Writers Remuneration Fund (SKFV) Material Scholarship for 2016

References

External links
 Official website (in Norwegian)
 Annelise Josefsen  at Nordnorsk kunstnersenter

1949 births
Living people
Sámi artists
20th-century Norwegian artists
21st-century Norwegian artists
Norwegian women artists
20th-century Norwegian sculptors
21st-century Norwegian sculptors
20th-century Norwegian women artists
21st-century Norwegian women artists
People from Hammerfest